R.E.M. Singles Collected is a compilation album from R.E.M. released in Europe by I.R.S. Records in 1994. The album includes the A-side and B-sides of singles spanning from their debut LP Murmur in 1983, right through to Document in 1987.

This was the last R.E.M.-related album to be released by I.R.S. Records, which would fold two years after its release.

Track listing
All songs written by Bill Berry, Peter Buck, Mike Mills and Michael Stipe, except where noted:
"Radio Free Europe" (Edit) – 3:11
"There She Goes Again" (Lou Reed) – 2:50
"So. Central Rain" – 3:16
"King of the Road" (Roger Miller) – 3:13
"(Don't Go Back To) Rockville" (Edit) – 3:54
"Catapult" (Live) – 3:55
"Cant Get There from Here" (Edit) – 3:13
"Bandwagon" (Berry, Buck, Mills, Stipe, and Lynda Stipe) – 2:16
"Wendell Gee" – 3:02
"Crazy" (Randall Bewley, Vanessa Briscoe, Curtis Crowe, Michael Lachowski) – 3:03
"Fall on Me" – 2:50
"Rotary Ten" – 2:00
"Superman" (Mike Bottler, Gary Zekley) – 2:52
"White Tornado" – 1:55
"The One I Love" – 3:16
"Maps and Legends" (Live) – 3:15
"It's the End of the World as We Know It (And I Feel Fine)" (Edit) – 3:11
"Last Date" (Floyd Cramer) – 2:16
"Finest Worksong" (Other Mix) – 3:47
"Time After Time Etc." (Live, September 14, 1987) (includes parts of "So. Central Rain (I'm Sorry)", and "Red Rain", written by Peter Gabriel) – 8:22

Sales certifications

References

Albums produced by Joe Boyd
Albums produced by Don Dixon (musician)
Albums produced by Don Gehman
Albums produced by Mitch Easter
Albums produced by Scott Litt
B-side compilation albums
R.E.M. compilation albums
1994 compilation albums
French-language compilation albums
I.R.S. Records compilation albums